Luis José Vallenilla Pacheco (born 13 March 1974) is a Venezuelan former professional footballer that played as a centre backfor the Venezuela national team from 1996 until 2008, earning 76 appearances and scoring 1 goal.

Club career
He began his career with Trujillanos F.C. in his native Venezuela in 1994 and stayed there four years until moving to Caracas F.C., gaining more than 100 appearances over 6 years. He moved to Argentina to play for Club Olimpo for a short time in 2004. In 2006, he moved back to venezuela to play for Mineros de Guayana for a season, then played for UA Maracaibo, then moved to Cyprus in Europe to play for Nea Salamis FC for a year, and finally went back to Mineros de Guayana for 8 years until his retirement in 2016.

International career
Vallenilla made 77 caps for the Venezuela national football team, scoring a goal. Vallenilla left the national team when manager César Farías arrived, who didn't select the player for the qualifiers of the 2010 FIFA World Cup.

International goals

External links
 
 International statistics

References

Living people
1974 births
Footballers from Caracas
Venezuelan footballers
Trujillanos FC players
Caracas FC players
Deportivo Táchira F.C. players
Olimpo footballers
C.D. Cuenca footballers
A.C.C.D. Mineros de Guayana players
UA Maracaibo players
Nea Salamis Famagusta FC players
Cypriot First Division players
Venezuelan expatriate footballers
Expatriate footballers in Ecuador
Expatriate footballers in Cyprus
Expatriate footballers in Argentina
Venezuelan expatriate sportspeople in Ecuador
Venezuelan expatriate sportspeople in Cyprus
Venezuelan expatriate sportspeople in Argentina
Venezuela international footballers
1997 Copa América players
2001 Copa América players
2004 Copa América players
2007 Copa América players
Association football defenders